Josh Greenbaum is an American film director, screenwriter, and producer. He has won an MTV Movie Award, CINE Golden Eagle and Emmy Award. He directed the feature documentary The Short Game, winner of the SXSW Audience Award, which was acquired by Netflix to launch their Originals film division. He also directed Becoming Bond a documentary about George Lazenby, which won SXSW's Audience Award in the Visions category as well as the critically-acclaimed Too Funny to Fail, a documentary about The Dana Carvey Show. He is also the creator, director and executive producer of Behind the Mask, which earned Hulu its first ever Emmy nomination.

Early life and career
Greenbaum was born in Saratoga Springs, New York. He graduated from Cornell University and the University of Oxford, earning an MFA in film from the University of Southern California's School of Cinematic Arts.

He won the 2007 MTV Movie Award for mtvU Best Filmmaker on Campus as well as the Coca-Cola Refreshing Filmmaker's Award while at USC.

In 2011, Greenbaum directed and co-wrote Clinton Foundation: Celebrity Division for Funny or Die, a short spoof starring Bill Clinton, Matt Damon, Kevin Spacey, Sean Penn, Ben Stiller, Jack Black, Ted Danson, Mary Steenburgen and Kristen Wiig shot for the Clinton Foundation. It premiered at Bill Clinton's "Decade of Difference" party at the Hollywood Bowl.

Film
Greenbaum directed the feature documentary The Short Game, which won the Audience Award at the 2013 SXSW Film Festival and was acquired by Netflix as its first exclusive documentary. The film was executive produced by Justin Timberlake and Jessica Biel.

He also directed Becoming Bond, a Hulu-distributed documentary about the Australian actor George Lazenby who portrayed James Bond in On Her Majesty's Secret Service, released in 2017. The film won SXSW's Audience Award in the Visions category and nominated for the festival's Adam Yauch Hornblower Award Nomination. It was also nominated for a Hot Docs Canadian International Documentary Festival Audience Award.

Greenbaum also directed Too Funny to Fail in 2017, a documentary about The Dana Carvey Show, also distributed by Hulu.

Greenbaum made his narrative feature debut directing Barb and Star Go to Vista Del Mar, released in 2021. The film was written by and stars Kristen Wiig and Annie Mumolo, and also features Jamie Dornan, Damon Wayans Jr. and Wendi McLendon-Covey.

In December 2021, it was announced that Greenbaum will direct the animated comedy film Strays starring Will Ferrell, Jamie Foxx, and Will Forte.

TV
Greenbaum created and directed Behind the Mask, a Hulu documentary series about sports mascots and the people in the costumes. The series earned Hulu its first Emmy nomination.

He directed episodes of New Girl for Fox, Fresh Off the Boat for ABC, Single Parents for Fox, Bless This Mess for ABC as well as two episodes of Deadbeat for Hulu and, Border Patrol featured on episodes of Comedy Central's Atom TV, created Nickelodeon's Max & Shred (nominated for the Canadian Screen Awards' Best Children's or Youth Fiction Program or Series in 2016) and directed "Good Debbie Hunting", an episode of ABC's The Neighbors. He has written and directed projects for CBS, NBC, FOX and The CW.

He also served as executive producer and director of The Playbook series for Netflix and directed the first episode, profiling NBA coach Doc Rivers.

Commercials
Greenbaum collaborated with After-School All-Stars charity, directing commercials that feature the organization's founder, Arnold Schwarzenegger. A commercial featuring Schwarzenegger on Hollywood Boulevard and at Madame Tussauds Hollywood in character as the Terminator interacting with tourists received more than 25 million views on YouTube and was awarded the YouTube Ad of the Year.

Awards and honors
 2017 SXSW Film Festival, VISIONS Audience Award Winner (Becoming Bond)
 2017 Hot Docs Canadian International Documentary Festival, Top 20 Audience Favourites (Becoming Bond)
 2016 Canadian Screen Award, nominated Max and Shred best Youth Fiction Series
 2014 Sports Emmy Awards, nominated — Outstanding New Approaches Sports Programming (Behind the Mask)
 2014 CINE Golden Eagle Film and Video Competition, Golden Eagle Televised Series (Behind the Mask)
 2013 SXSW Film Festival, Audience Award Documentary Feature (The Short Game)
 2013 Hamptons International Film Festival, Audience Award Best Documentary Feature (The Short Game)
 2013 Maui Film Festival, Audience Award Feature Documentary (The Short Game)
 2013 Nantucket Film Festival, Best Feature, Audience Award 2nd Place (The Short Game)
 2012 The Webby Awards, Best Comedy Long Form or Series (The Clinton Foundation: Celebrity Division)
 2007 MTV Movie Awards, MTV Movie Award Best New Filmmaker (Border Patrol)
 2007 Coca-Cola Refreshing Filmmaker's Award, Red Ribbon Award
 2007 Emmy Awards (Rocky Mountain), Documentary – Topical (Mwana Wako Ni Mwana Wanga - - Your Child Is My Child, Park City Television)
 2005 Emmy Awards (Rocky Mountain), Sports Program, Editing – Programs, Documentaries and Magazines (Endurance 100, Park City Television)

Selected filmography
 2023 – Strays, director, producer
 2021 - Barb and Star Go To Vista Del Mar
 2020 The Playbook, “Doc Rivers”, director, executive producer 
 2019 Bless This Mess, "The Estonian Method", director
 2018-19 Single Parents, "The Beast!", "The Shed", “Raining Blood!”, director
 2017 - Too Funny to Fail
 2017 - Becoming Bond
 2017-19 Fresh Off The Boat, "The Vouch", ”Where Have All The Cattleman Gone?“, “Legends of the Fortieth“, director
 2016-18 New Girl, “Helmet”, "The Hike", "Rumspringa", "Tuesday Meeting", "The Curse Of The Pirate Bride", director
 2015 Arnold Pranks Fans as the Terminator (short), writer, director 
 2013 – present, Behind the Mask, executive producer, creator, director
 2013  The Neighbors, "Good Debbie Hunting", director
 2013 The Short Game, director, producer
 2014-16, Max & Shred, creator, writer
 2011 –  Ricky and Ravi (Are in Between Jobs), creator, director, writer
 2011 Clinton Foundation: Celebrity Division (short), director, writer
 2007 Border Patrol (short), executive producer, director, editor writer
 2007 Sole Mates (short), writer, director, producer
 2007 The Morning Routine (short), writer, director, producer
 2007 The Beginning and the End (short) writer, director, producer

References

External links
 
 Home page

Living people
Alumni of the University of Oxford
American male screenwriters
Cornell University alumni
Film directors from California
Film directors from New York (state)
People from Saratoga Springs, New York
Screenwriters from California
USC School of Cinematic Arts alumni
Year of birth missing (living people)